The women's flyweight (−49 kilograms) event at the 2010 Asian Games took place on 17 November 2010 at Guangdong Gymnasium, Guangzhou, China.

At the first round, Yang Shu-chun of Chinese Taipei was controversially disqualified near the end of the first period when she was leading 9-0 against her Vietnamese opponent Vũ Thị Hậu. "Unauthorized" electronic sensors were allegedly found in her socks before or during the match. Yang's equipment had passed the pre-match inspection. After the disqualification, Yang protested the judgement in tears and refused to leave the mat. Yang's disqualification drew a furious response from media and fans in Taiwan.

Schedule
All times are China Standard Time (UTC+08:00)

Results 
Legend
DQ — Won by disqualification
R — Won by referee stop contest

References

Results

External links
Official website

Taekwondo at the 2010 Asian Games